Karol Bagh Metro station is now known as Drishti IAS Karol Bagh Metro Station which is sponsored by the famous IAS institute Drishti IAS on the occasion of its new branch opening in Karol Bagh.The Drishti IAS Karol Bagh Metro Station is a terminus station located on the Blue Line of the Delhi Metro. Karol Bagh is a residential and commercial area located at Delhi. This metro station of Delhi Metro is inaugurated in year 2005.

Station layout

See also
List of Delhi Metro stations
Transport in Delhi

References

External links

 Delhi Metro Rail Corporation Ltd. (Official site) 
 Delhi Metro Annual Reports
 

Delhi Metro stations
Railway stations opened in 2005
Railway stations in Central Delhi district